Significant figures (also known as the significant digits, precision or resolution) of a number in positional notation are digits in the number that are reliable and necessary to indicate the quantity of something.

If a number expressing the result of a measurement (e.g., length, pressure, volume, or mass) has more digits than the number of digits allowed by the measurement resolution, then only as many digits as allowed by the measurement resolution are reliable, and so only these can be significant figures.
 
For example, if a length measurement gives 114.8 mm while the smallest interval between marks on the ruler used in the measurement is 1 mm, then the first three digits (1, 1, and 4, showing 114 mm) are certain and so they are significant figures.  Digits which are uncertain but reliable are also considered significant figures.  In this example, the last digit (8, which adds 0.8 mm) is also considered a significant figure even though there is uncertainty in it.

Another example is a volume measurement of 2.98 L with an uncertainty of ± 0.05 L.  The actual volume is somewhere between 2.93 L and 3.03 L.  Even when some of the digits are not certain, as long as they are reliable, they are considered significant because they indicate the actual volume within the acceptable degree of uncertainty.  In this example the actual volume might be 2.94 L or might instead be 3.02 L.  And so all three are significant figures.

The following digits are not significant figures.

 All leading zeros. For example, 013 kg has two significant figures, 1 and 3, and the leading zero is not significant since it is not necessary to indicate the mass; 013 kg = 13 kg so 0 is not necessary. In the case of 0.056 m there are two insignificant leading zeros since 0.056 m = 56 mm and so the leading zeros are not necessary to indicate the length.
 Trailing zeros when they are merely placeholders. For example, the trailing zeros in 1500 m as a length measurement are not significant if they are just placeholders for ones and tens places as the measurement resolution is 100 m. In this case, 1500 m means the length to measure is close to 1500 m rather than saying that the length is exactly 1500 m.
 Spurious digits, introduced by calculations resulting in a number with a greater precision than the precision of the used data in the calculations, or in a measurement reported to a greater precision than the measurement resolution.

Of the significant figures in a number, the most significant is the digit with the highest exponent value (simply the left-most significant figure), and the least significant is the digit with the lowest exponent value (simply the right-most significant figure). For example, in the number "123", the "1" is the most significant figure as it counts hundreds (102), and "3" is the least significant figure as it counts ones (100).
 
Significance arithmetic is a set of approximate rules for roughly maintaining significance throughout a computation. The more sophisticated scientific rules are known as propagation of uncertainty.

Numbers are often rounded to avoid reporting insignificant figures. For example, it would create false precision to express a measurement as 12.34525 kg if the scale was only measured to the nearest gram. In this case, the significant figures are the first 5 digits from the left-most digit (1, 2, 3, 4, and 5), and the number needs to be rounded to the significant figures so that it will be 12.345 kg as the reliable value. Numbers can also be rounded merely for simplicity rather than to indicate a precision of measurement, for example, in order to make the numbers faster to pronounce in news broadcasts.

Radix 10 (base-10, decimal numbers) is assumed in the following.

Identifying significant figures

Rules to identify significant figures in a number 

Note that identifying the significant figures in a number requires knowing which digits are reliable (e.g., by knowing the measurement or reporting resolution with which the number is obtained or processed) since only reliable digits can be significant; e.g., 3 and 4 in 0.00234 g are not significant if the measurable smallest weight is 0.001 g.
Non-zero digits within the given measurement or reporting resolution are significant.
91 has two significant figures (9 and 1) if they are measurement-allowed digits.
123.45 has five significant digits (1, 2, 3, 4 and 5) if they are within the measurement resolution. If the resolution is 0.1, then the last digit 5 is not significant.
Zeros between two significant non-zero digits are significant (significant trapped zeros).
101.12003 consists of eight significant figures if the resolution is to 0.00001.
125.340006 has seven significant figures if the resolution is to 0.0001: 1, 2, 5, 3, 4, 0, and 0.
Zeros to the left of the first non-zero digit (leading zeros) are not significant.
If a length measurement gives 0.052 km, then 0.052 km = 52 m so 5 and 2 are only significant; the leading zeros appear or disappear, depending on which unit is used, so they are not necessary to indicate the measurement scale.
0.00034 has 2 significant figures (3 and 4) if the resolution is 0.00001. 
Zeros to the right of the last non-zero digit (trailing zeros) in a number with the decimal point are significant if they are within the measurement or reporting resolution.
1.200 has four significant figures (1, 2, 0, and 0) if they are allowed by the measurement resolution.
0.0980 has three significant digits (9, 8, and the last zero) if they are within the measurement resolution.
120.000 consists of six significant figures (1, 2, and the four subsequent zeroes) if, as before, they are within the measurement resolution.
Trailing zeros in an integer may or may not be significant, depending on the measurement or reporting resolution.
45,600 has 3, 4 or 5 significant figures depending on how the last zeros are used. For example, if the length of a road is reported as 45600 m without information about the reporting or measurement resolution, then it is not clear if the road length is precisely measured as 45600 m or if it is a rough estimate. If it is the rough estimation, then only the first three non-zero digits are significant since the trailing zeros are neither reliable nor necessary; 45600 m can be expressed as 45.6 km or as 4.56 × 104 m in scientific notation, and neither expression requires the trailing zeros.
An exact number has an infinite number of significant figures.
If the number of apples in a bag is 4 (exact number), then this number is 4.0000... (with infinite trailing zeros to the right of the decimal point). As a result, 4 does not impact the number of significant figures or digits in the result of calculations with it.
A mathematical or physical constant has significant figures to its known digits.
π, as the ratio of the circumference to the diameter of a circle, is 3.14159265358979323... known to more than 62 trillion digits calculated as of 19 August 2021, and that calculated 'π' approximation has that many significant digits, while in practical applications far fewer are used (and π itself has infinite significant digits, as all irrational numbers do). Often 3.14 is used in numerical calculations, i.e. 3 significant decimal digits, with 7 correct binary digits (while the more accurate 22/7 is also used, even though it also only amounts to the same 3 significant correct decimal digits, it has 10 correct binary digits), which is a good enough approximation for many practical uses. Most calculators, and computer programs, can handle 3.141592653589793, 16 decimal digits, that is commonly used in computers and used by NASA for "JPL's highest accuracy calculations, which are for interplanetary navigation". For "the largest size there is: the visible universe [..] you would need 39 or 40 decimal places."

Ways to denote significant figures in an integer with trailing zeros 
The significance of trailing zeros in a number not containing a decimal point can be ambiguous. For example, it may not always be clear if the number 1300 is precise to the nearest unit (just happens coincidentally to be an exact multiple of a hundred) or if it is only shown to the nearest hundreds due to rounding or uncertainty. Many conventions exist to address this issue. However, these are not universally used and would only be effective if the reader is familiar with the convention:

An overline, sometimes also called an overbar, or less accurately, a vinculum, may be placed over the last significant figure; any trailing zeros following this are insignificant. For example, 130 has three significant figures (and hence indicates that the number is precise to the nearest ten).

Less often, using a closely related convention, the last significant figure of a number may be underlined; for example, "1300" has two significant figures.

A decimal point may be placed after the number; for example "1300." indicates specifically that trailing zeros are meant to be significant.

As the conventions above are not in general use, the following more widely recognized options are available for indicating the significance of number with trailing zeros:

Eliminate ambiguous or non-significant zeros by changing the unit prefix in a number with a unit of measurement. For example, the precision of measurement specified as 1300 g is ambiguous, while if stated as 1.30 kg it is not. Likewise 0.0123 L can be rewritten as 12.3 mL

Eliminate ambiguous or non-significant zeros by using Scientific Notation: For example, 1300 with three significant figures becomes . The part of the representation that contains the significant figures (1.30 or 1.23) is known as the significand or mantissa. The digits in the base and exponent ( or ) are considered exact numbers so for these digits, significant figures are irrelevant.

Explicitly state the number of significant figures (the abbreviation s.f. is sometimes used): For example "20 000 to 2 s.f." or "20 000 (2 sf)".

State the expected variability (precision) explicitly with a plus–minus sign, as in 20 000 ± 1%. This also allows specifying a range of precision in-between powers of ten.

Rounding to significant figures 
Rounding to significant figures is a more general-purpose technique than rounding to n digits, since it handles numbers of different scales in a uniform way. For example, the population of a city might only be known to the nearest thousand and be stated as 52,000, while the population of a country might only be known to the nearest million and be stated as 52,000,000. The former might be in error by hundreds, and the latter might be in error by hundreds of thousands, but both have two significant figures (5 and 2). This reflects the fact that the significance of the error is the same in both cases, relative to the size of the quantity being measured.

To round a number to n significant figures:

 If the n + 1 digit is greater than 5 or is 5 followed by other non-zero digits, add 1 to the n digit. For example, if we want to round 1.2459 to 3 significant figures, then this step results in 1.25.
 If the n + 1 digit is 5 not followed by other digits or followed by only zeros, then rounding requires a tie-breaking rule. For example, to round 1.25 to 2 significant figures:
 Round half away from zero (also known as "5/4") rounds up to 1.3. This is the default rounding method implied in many disciplines if the required rounding method is not specified.
 Round half to even, which rounds to the nearest even number. With this method, 1.25 is rounded down to 1.2. If this method applies to 1.35, then it is rounded up to 1.4. This is the method preferred by many scientific disciplines, because, for example, it avoids skewing the average value of a long list of values upwards.
 For an integer in rounding, replace the digits after the n digit with zeros. For example, if 1254 is rounded to 2 significant figures, then 5 and 4 are replaced to 0 so that it will be 1300. For a number with the decimal point in rounding, remove the digits after the n digit. For example, if 14.895 is rounded to 3 significant figures, then the digits after 8 are removed so that it will be 14.9.

In financial calculations, a number is often rounded to a given number of places. For example, to two places after the decimal separator for many world currencies. This is done because greater precision is immaterial, and usually it is not possible to settle a debt of less than the smallest currency unit.

In UK personal tax returns, income is rounded down to the nearest pound, whilst tax paid is calculated to the nearest penny.

As an illustration, the decimal quantity 12.345 can be expressed with various numbers of significant figures or decimal places. If insufficient precision is available then the number is rounded in some manner to fit the available precision. The following table shows the results for various total precision at two rounding ways (N/A stands for Not Applicable).

Another example for 0.012345. (Remember that the leading zeros are not significant.)

The representation of a non-zero number x to a precision of p significant digits has a numerical value that is given by the formula:

where

which may need to be written with a specific marking as detailed above to specify the number of significant trailing zeros.

Writing uncertainty and implied uncertainty

Significant figures in writing uncertainty 
The rules to write are:

 σx has only one or two significant figures as more precise uncertainty has no meaning.
 1.79 ± 0.06 (correct), 1.79 ± 0.96 (correct), 1.79 ± 1.96 (incorrect).
 The digit positions of the last significant figures in xbest and σx are the same, otherwise the consistency is lost. For example, in 1.79 ± 0.067 (incorrect), it does not make sense to have more accurate uncertainty than the best estimate. 1.79 ± 0.9 (incorrect) also does not make sense since the rounding guideline for addition and subtraction below tells that the edges of the true value range are 2.7 and 0.9, that are less accurate than the best estimate.
 1.79 ± 0.06 (correct), 1.79 ± 0.96 (correct), 1.79 ± 0.067 (incorrect), 1.79 ± 0.9 (incorrect).

Implied uncertainty 
In chemistry (and may also be for other scientific branches), uncertainty may be implied by the last significant figure if it is not explicitly expressed. The implied uncertainty is ± the half of the minimum scale at the last significant figure position. For example, if the volume of water in a bottle is reported as 3.78 L without mentioning uncertainty, then ± 0.005 L measurement uncertainty may be implied. If 2.97 ± 0.07 kg, so the actual weight is somewhere in 2.90 to 3.04 kg, is measured and it is desired to report it with a single number, then 3.0 kg is the best number to report since its implied uncertainty ± 0.05 kg tells the weight range of 2.95 to 3.05 kg that is close to the measurement range. If 2.97 ± 0.09 kg, then 3.0 kg is still the best since, if 3 kg is reported then its implied uncertainty ± 0.5 tells the range of 2.5 to 3.5 kg that is too wide in comparison with the measurement range.

If there is a need to write the implied uncertainty of a number, then it can be written as with stating it as the implied uncertainty (to prevent readers from recognizing it as the measurement uncertainty), where x and σx are the number with an extra zero digit (to follow the rules to write uncertainty above) and the implied uncertainty of it respectively. For example, 6 kg with the implied uncertainty ± 0.5 kg can be stated as 6.0 ± 0.5 kg.

Arithmetic 

As there are rules to determine the significant figures in directly measured quantities, there are also guidelines (not rules) to determine the significant figures in quantities calculated from these measured quantities.

Significant figures in measured quantities are most important in the determination of significant figures in calculated quantities with them. A mathematical or physical constant (e.g.,  in the formula for the area of a circle with radius  as ) has no effect on the determination of the significant figures in the result of a calculation with it if its known digits are equal to or more than the significant figures in the measured quantities used in the calculation.

The guidelines described below are intended to avoid a calculation result more precise than the measured quantities, but it does not ensure the resulted implied uncertainty close enough to the measured uncertainties. This problem can be seen in unit conversion. If the guidelines give the implied uncertainty too far from the measured ones, then it may be needed to decide significant digits that give comparable uncertainty.

Multiplication and division 
For quantities created from measured quantities via multiplication and division, the calculated result should have as many significant figures as the least number of significant figures among the measured quantities used in the calculation. For example, 
 1.234 × 2 = .468 ≈ 2
 1.234 × 2.0 = 2.68 ≈ 2.5
 0.01234 × 2 = 0.0468 ≈ 0.02
with one, two, and one significant figures respectively. (2 here is assumed not an exact number.) For the first example, the first multiplication factor has four significant figures and the second has one significant figure. The factor with the fewest or least significant figures is the second one with only one, so the final calculated result should also have one significant figure.

Exception 
For unit conversion, the implied uncertainty of the result can be unsatisfactorily higher than that in the previous unit if this rounding guideline is followed; For example, 8 inch has the implied uncertainty of ± 0.5 inch = ± 1.27 cm. If it is converted to the centimeter scale and the rounding guideline for multiplication and division is followed, then 0.32 cm ≈ 20 cm with the implied uncertainty of ± 5 cm. If this implied uncertainty is considered as too overestimated, then more proper significant digits in the unit conversion result may be 2.32 cm ≈ 20. cm with the implied uncertainty of ± 0.5 cm.

Another exception of applying the above rounding guideline is to multiply a number by an integer, such as 1.234 × 9. If the above guideline is followed, then the result is rounded as 1.234 × 9.000.... = 11.16 ≈ 11.11. However, this multiplication is essentially adding 1.234 to itself 9 times such as 1.234 + 1.234 + … + 1.234 so the rounding guideline for addition and subtraction described below is more proper rounding approach. As a result, the final answer is 1.234 + 1.234 + … + 1.234 = 11.10 = 11.106 (one significant digit increase).

Addition and subtraction 
For quantities created from measured quantities via addition and subtraction, the last significant figure position (e.g., hundreds, tens, ones, tenths, hundredths, and so forth) in the calculated result should be the same as the leftmost or largest digit position among the last significant figures of the measured quantities in the calculation. For example, 
 1.234 + 2 = .234 ≈ 3
 1.234 + 2.0 = 3.34 ≈ 3.2
 0.01234 + 2 = .01234 ≈ 2
with the last significant figures in the ones place, tenths place, and ones place respectively. (2 here is assumed not an exact number.) For the first example, the first term has its last significant figure in the thousandths place and the second term has its last significant figure in the ones place. The leftmost or largest digit position among the last significant figures of these terms is the ones place, so the calculated result should also have its last significant figure in the ones place.

The rule to calculate significant figures for multiplication and division are not the same as the rule for addition and subtraction. For multiplication and division, only the total number of significant figures in each of the factors in the calculation matters; the digit position of the last significant figure in each factor is irrelevant. For addition and subtraction, only the digit position of the last significant figure in each of the terms in the calculation matters; the total number of significant figures in each term is irrelevant.  However, greater accuracy will often be obtained if some non-significant digits are maintained in intermediate results which are used in subsequent calculations.

Logarithm and antilogarithm 
The base-10 logarithm of a normalized number (i.e., a × 10b with 1 ≤ a < 10 and b as an integer), is rounded such that its decimal part (called mantissa) has as many significant figures as the significant figures in the normalized number.

 log10(3.000 × 104) = log10(104) + log10(3.000) = 4.000000... (exact number so infinite significant digits) + 0.477212547... = 4.477212547 ≈ 4.4771.

When taking the antilogarithm of a normalized number, the result is rounded to have as many significant figures as the significant figures in the decimal part of the number to be antiloged.

 104.4771 = 2998.5318119... = 30000 = 3.000 × 104.

Transcendental functions 
If a transcendental function  (e.g., the exponential function, the logarithm, and the trigonometric functions) is differentiable at its domain element x, then its number of significant figures (denoted as "significant figures of ") is approximately related with the number of significant figures in x (denoted as "significant figures of x") by the formula

,

where  is the condition number. See the significance arithmetic article to find its derivation.

Round only on the final calculation result 
When performing multiple stage calculations, do not round intermediate stage calculation results; keep as many digits as is practical (at least one more digit than the rounding rule allows per stage) until the end of all the calculations to avoid cumulative rounding errors while tracking or recording the significant figures in each intermediate result. Then, round the final result, for example, to the fewest number of significant figures (for multiplication or division) or leftmost last significant digit position (for addition or subtraction) among the inputs in the final calculation.

 (2.3494 + 1.345) × 1.2 = 3.694 × 1.2 = 4.3328  ≈ 4.4.
 (2.3494 × 1.345) + 1.2 = 3.15943 + 1.2 = 4.59943  ≈ 4.4.

Estimating an extra digit 
When using a ruler, initially use the smallest mark as the first estimated digit. For example, if a ruler's smallest mark is 0.1 cm, and 4.5 cm is read, then it is 4.5 (±0.1 cm) or 4.4 cm to 4.6 cm as to the smallest mark interval. However, in practice a measurement can usually be estimated by eye to closer than the interval between the ruler's smallest mark, e.g. in the above case it might be estimated as between 4.51 cm and 4.53 cm.

It is also possible that the overall length of a ruler may not be accurate to the degree of the smallest mark, and the marks may be imperfectly spaced within each unit. However assuming a normal good quality ruler, it should be possible to estimate tenths between the nearest two marks to achieve an extra decimal place of accuracy. Failing to do this adds the error in reading the ruler to any error in the calibration of the ruler.

Estimation in statistic 

When estimating the proportion of individuals carrying some particular characteristic in a population, from a random sample of that population, the number of significant figures should not exceed the maximum precision allowed by that sample size.

Relationship to accuracy and precision in measurement 

Traditionally, in various technical fields, "accuracy" refers to the closeness of a given measurement to its true value; "precision" refers to the stability of that measurement when repeated many times. Thus, it is possible to be "precisely wrong".  Hoping to reflect the way in which the term "accuracy" is actually used in the scientific community, there is a recent standard, ISO 5725, which keeps the same definition of precision but defines the term "trueness" as the closeness of a given measurement to its true value and uses the term "accuracy" as the combination of trueness and precision.  (See the accuracy and precision article for a full discussion.)  In either case, the number of significant figures roughly corresponds to precision, not to accuracy or the newer concept of trueness.

In computing 

Computer representations of floating-point numbers use a form of rounding to significant figures (while usually not keeping track of how many), in general with binary numbers. The number of correct significant figures is closely related to the notion of relative error (which has the advantage of being a more accurate measure of precision, and is independent of the radix, also known as the base, of the number system used).

See also 

Benford's law (first-digit law)
Engineering notation
Error bar
False precision
IEEE 754 (IEEE floating-point standard)
Interval arithmetic
Kahan summation algorithm
Precision (computer science)
Round-off error

References

External links 
 Significant Figures Video by Khan academy

Arithmetic
Numerical analysis